John Merin Bozeman (January 1835 – April 20, 1867) was a pioneer and frontiersman in the American West who helped establish the Bozeman Trail through Wyoming Territory into the gold fields of southwestern Montana Territory in the early 1860s. He helped found the city of Bozeman, Montana in 1864, which is named for him.

Life
Bozeman was born in Pickens County, Georgia in January 1835 to William and Delila Sims Bozeman.

Bozeman married Lucinda Catherine Ingram, and the couple had three daughters. In 1860, John Bozeman headed west to join in the Pike's Peak Gold Rush in Colorado, leaving behind his wife and children. After his mining claims in Colorado failed, Bozeman traveled to Deer Lodge in western Montana Territory in 1862 to work the gold fields discovered by James and Granville Stuart. Bozeman later joined the January 1863 rush to newly discovered gold in Bannack, Montana, but his claims there proved unsuccessful.

Seeing that it would be more profitable to "mine the miners" than to mine for gold, Bozeman enlisted the support of another unsuccessful Bannack prospector and friend, John Jacobs, to explore a new and shorter route into Montana Territory from the east. In 1863, he and John Jacobs blazed the Bozeman Trail, a cutoff route from the Oregon Trail in Wyoming to Bannack, Montana, and guided miners to Virginia City through the Gallatin Valley. Bozeman settled in the Gallatin Valley at a site "standing right in the gate of the mountains, ready to swallow up all tenderfeet that would reach the territory from the east, with their golden fleeces to be taken care of". The route spanned the eastern front of the Rockies north to the Yellowstone River, then west across the Bozeman Pass. In 1864, he laid out the town of Bozeman, Montana. Its proximity to the trail helped it to grow in the following years, especially as migration to Montana increased after the discovery of gold at Virginia City in 1864.

In 1865, federal troops began guarding the trail from hostile Indian attacks, since the trail ran through lands reserved by treaty to Indian tribes. The federal government constructed Forts Reno, Phil Kearny, and C. F. Smith to defend the trail. The Sioux tribe "succeeded by closing the road by a massacre near Fort Kearny" in 1866. The trail was briefly abandoned.

Death

Bozeman was murdered on April 20, 1867 (aged 32) while traveling along the Yellowstone River to Fort C.F. Smith to secure a flour contract. His partner, Tom Cover, reported they had been attacked by a band of Blackfeet Natives, but some historians suspected that Bozeman was killed by Cover himself, or perhaps even by a henchman of pioneer Montana rancher Nelson Story named Thomas Kent. The end of Bozeman's life is still a subject of debate today, and some theorize that he was murdered in revenge for his habit of flirting with married women.

Archives
John M. Bozeman's papers are now held by Archives and Special Collections at Montana State University.

See also
List of unsolved murders

Notes

External links
https://web.archive.org/web/20050404124520/http://bozemantrail.org/bt-corridor.html
 (as John Marion Bozeman)
John M. Bozeman Collection|https://www.lib.montana.edu/archives/finding-aids/0680.html

1835 births
1867 deaths
1867 murders in the United States
American city founders
American murder victims
Explorers of Montana
Male murder victims
People of the American Old West
People from Bozeman, Montana
People from Pickens County, Georgia
People murdered in Montana
Unsolved murders in the United States